Edgerton is a suburb of the town of Huddersfield in West Yorkshire, England. The suburb is located along the A629 road, also known as Edgerton Road, from Huddersfield to Halifax. It is the location of many of the towns largest and most imposing houses, as well as the town's principal cemetery.

Although the place name has been traced back to the 14th century, Edgerton started its development in the early 19th century, when three substantial Georgian houses were built in the area. One of these houses, Edgerton Hill, survives today as the town's Ukrainian Club. By 1896, Huddersfield Corporation Tramways had built one of its pioneering steam tram lines through Edgerton. This was succeeded in turn by electric trams, trolley buses and motor buses.

Politically, Edgerton forms part of the Greenhead ward of the metropolitan borough of Kirklees and is within the Huddersfield parliamentary constituency. It is bordered to the north by the suburb of Birkby, to the east by the town centre, to the west by Lindley and to the south by Marsh.

Gallery

See also
Listed buildings in Huddersfield (Greenhead Ward)

References

Areas of Huddersfield